Wisher or Wischer is a surname. Notable people with the surname include:

 Klara Wischer (born 1991), Australian basketball player
 Michael Wisher (1935–1995), British actor
 William Wisher Jr. (born 1958), American screenwriter
 Yolanda Wisher (born 1976), American poet